RSNF may refer to:

Royal Saudi Naval Forces
Ring sum normal form, a special normal form in Boolean mathematics